Molecular and Cellular Endocrinology is a peer-reviewed academic journal of endocrinology established in 1974. The journal is published by Elsevier, and edited by  C. Klinge, C. Stratakis, and R. Laybutt.

Indexing

Molecular and Cellular Endocrinology in indexed in:

Publications established in 1974
Elsevier academic journals
Endocrinology journals